Eital Bredenkamp (born 28 January 1993 in Pretoria, South Africa) is a South African rugby union player who last played for  in the Currie Cup. His regular position is flanker, but he occasionally plays as a hooker.

Career

Youth

He played for and captained his high school, Pretoria-based Afrikaanse Hoër Seunskool at schoolboy level.

Bredenkamp started that match to help his side to win the title by running out 22–18 winners.

In 2013, he became involved in the  set-up and appeared on ten occasions during the 2013 Under-21 Provincial Championship. He mainly played off the bench – making just two starts – but still contributed to the cause by scoring five tries for his side. He played in the final as Western Province beat the  30–23.

He played for the Under-21 side once more during the 2014 Under-21 Provincial Championship, also being named captain for the campaign. He finished as the top try scorer in Group A of the competition, scoring thirteen tries in twelve appearances. This included hat-tricks in their matches against  in their opening match of the season and against  in a 90–0 demolition.

Western Province

He made his first class debut for  during the 2014 Vodacom Cup. Despite playing as a flanker for the majority of his rugby career, he was named as the replacement hooker for their opening match of the season against  and came off the bench shortly after half-time to make his debut in a 16–8 victory.

Eastern Province Kings

He was one of three players (along with Tazz Fuzani and Jan Uys) that moved from the Western Cape to the Eastern Cape to join Port Elizabeth-based side  for the 2015 season. He made his debut for the EP Kings by starting their first match of the 2015 Vodacom Cup season, a 19–27 defeat to defending champions .

References

South African rugby union players
Living people
1993 births
Rugby union players from Pretoria
Rugby union hookers
Rugby union flankers
Eastern Province Elephants players
Western Province (rugby union) players
Southern Kings players